Nicholas John Bennett  (born 30 September 1948) is a British civil servant. He is Director-General of Strategic Technologies at the Ministry of Defence (UK).

He became a Companion of the Order of the Bath in the 2008 New Year Honours.

References

Companions of the Order of the Bath
Civil servants in the Ministry of Defence (United Kingdom)
Place of birth missing (living people)
1948 births
Living people